Cratichneumon culex is a species of the parasitic wasp of the family Ichneumonidae. The species was first described by Müller in 1776.

Description

As usual in Incheumonidae these solitary parasitic wasps have an elongated abdomen and very long antennae. The body is black, while the legs are reddish or reddish with white markings and the antennae are partially white.

Distribution and habitat
This species can be found in most of Europe. It lives in hedge rows.

Biology
This species is a pupal parasitoid. Adults parasite the pupae of the winter moth Operophtera brumata. Other recorded hosts are Semiothisa species and Bupalus piniarius (Geometridae), Tethea or (Drepanidae), Notodonta dromedarius (Notodontidae), Dasychira pudibunda (Lymantridae) and Panolis flammea (Noctuidae). These wasps are mainly active in the late summer. They search for their prey in the soil. The females lay eggs into pupae with the ovipositor.

References

External links
 Nature Images
 Mijn tuin
 Barry Fotopage

Ichneumonidae
Insects described in 1776
Taxa named by Otto Friedrich Müller